Đuro Popijač (born 23 April 1959) is a member of the 7th Croatian Parliament and an Ex-Minister.

He was named the Chairman of the Board of Petrokemija, a company for the production of artificial fertilizers in February 2017.

Education 
He graduated from the Engineering College in Maribor and obtained his degree of Master of Science in Economics from the Faculty of Economics in Zagreb.

Political party  
Croatian Democratic Union

Position 
Deputy Club of the Croatian Democratic Union

Parliamentary tenure 
 Member of Parliament   term of office started on 22 December 2011
 Member of Parliament term of office ended on 23 December 2015

References 

Croatian Democratic Union politicians
1959 births
Living people
Faculty of Economics and Business, University of Zagreb alumni
Politicians from Zagreb
Businesspeople from Zagreb